Black Diamond (1898-1929) was an Indian elephant owned by the Al G. Barnes Circus.

Life and death
A good worker but prone to fits of temper, he was generally kept chained to two calm female elephants during parades through the towns the circus visited. On October 12, 1929, while being unloaded in Corsicana, Texas, Black Diamond went on a rampage, injuring his long-time former trainer, H. D. (Curley) Pritchett, and killing Pritchett's current employer, Eva Speed Donohoo (or Donohue).

Ms. Donohoo was allegedly the fourth person Black Diamond had killed, so after his recapture he was deemed too dangerous to continue with the circus and the decision was made to put him down. 

Numerous ideas were floated but his size made most of them unworkable. The initial plan was poison but apparently it was attempted and failed. The final decision was to shoot him.  As many as 50, perhaps more than 100, shots were required before Black Diamond died.

Aftermath 
His mounted head, on display in a museum in Houston, Texas for many years, was eventually acquired by a local Corsicana businessman, Carmack Watkins, who had been a five-year-old boy in the crowd that day in October 1929. Allegedly, one of his feet was made into a pedestal for a bust of Hans Nagle, Houston's first zookeeper, the man who fired the final shot that brought Black Diamond down. Another one of his legs is on display in the old post office in the ghost town of Helena, Texas.

In 2006, singer/songwriter Al Evans wrote "Black Diamond's Song," a lament from the pachyderm's perspective.

In 1999, Curtis Eller's American Circus recorded "The Execution of Black Diamond," a retelling of the events of October 12, 1929.

See also
 List of individual elephants

References

Further reading
 "Black Diamond."  Roadside America.
 "Killing Rampage: Man Marks 70th Anniversary of Circus Elephant's Wild Run."  Corsicana Daily Sun, October 13, 1999
  Wood, Amy Louise. “‘Killing the Elephant’: Murderous Beasts and the Thrill of Retribution, 1885—1930.” The Journal of the Gilded Age and Progressive Era, vol. 11, no. 3, 2012, pp. 405–44. JSTOR.

External links
 elephant database: Black Diamond

Individual elephants
Circus animals
Deaths by firearm in Texas
1929 animal deaths
1898 animal births